Forrest Allan Claunch (December 26, 1939 – November 19, 2013) was an American politician who served in the Oklahoma House of Representatives from the 101st district from 1994 to 2004.

He died of pancreatic cancer on November 19, 2013, in Midwest City, Oklahoma at age 73.

References

1939 births
2013 deaths
People from Pampa, Texas
Republican Party members of the Oklahoma House of Representatives
Deaths from cancer in Oklahoma
Deaths from pancreatic cancer